Dina Orschmann (born 8 January 1998) is a German footballer who plays as a midfielder for Rangers in the Scottish Women's Premier League.

Career
Orschmann started her career with her twin sister Katja  in the youth team of SFC Stern 1900, before moving to 1. FC Union Berlin in 2013 and went through several Berlin selection teams up to U-18. At Union, she moved up to the senior team in October 2014.
 
She made her debut in the Bundesliga second division on 26 April 2015 against VfL Bochum. 
She appeared in 13 games for Union Berlin, but could not avoid relegation. After being relegated to the Regional North League, Orschmann became a regular at Union and scored 22 goals in 20 games to get promoted back to the Bundesliga second division.
 
After scoring nine goals for Berlin in 20 games in the 2nd Bundesliga North in the 2016/17 season, she left to attend the University of Central Florida in the US, for whose football team Central Florida Knights she also played.
On February 19, 2019, she returned to Germany and signed a six-month contract with Turbine Potsdam. Almost two months later, she made her Bundesliga debut in a 3–0 win over MSV Duisburg. On May 22, 2019, she renewed her contract for the 2019/20 season with Potsdam.
In 2022 she joined Rangers. In January 2023 she left Rangers to join FC Union Berlin

Orschmann made her U-17 debut on February 17, 2015 in a 4–2 win over England. Almost four months later, on June 16, 2015, she was appointed to the U-17 European Championship squad.

She was included in the squad for the 2016 FIFA U-20 Women's World Cup in Papua New Guinea, She scored in the group match against South Korea. Germany reached the quarter finals where they were defeated by France. In 2018 she took part in her second 2018 FIFA U-20 Woman's World Cup in France. Germany reached the semi final against Japan where they lost 1–3.

References

External links
 German Football Association Profile

1998 births
Living people
German women's footballers
German expatriate women's footballers
Germany women's youth international footballers
1. FFC Turbine Potsdam players
UCF Knights women's soccer players
Rangers W.F.C. players
Women's association football midfielders
Scottish Women's Premier League players
Expatriate women's soccer players in the United States
German expatriate sportspeople in the United States
German expatriate sportspeople in Scotland
Expatriate women's footballers in Scotland
Twin sportspeople
German twins
Footballers from Berlin